Air Kärnten was an Austrian start-up airline which never started operations.

History
The company was founded in November 2014 and was named after the Austrian state of Carinthia or Kärnten in German. It planned to launch twice weekly scheduled flights from Klagenfurt to London-Southend in May 2015 alongside several charter services. It announced charter flights from Klagenfurt to Girona, Lisbon, Palma de Mallorca, Naples, Rhodes and Kos as well as from Graz Airport to Preveza.

However, on 31 March 2015, Air Kärnten cancelled their planned scheduled route from Klagenfurt to London Southend Airport ahead of its start due to low demand - it just received nine bookings since the announcement of the route. In February 2015, it has been reported that several Austrian travel agencies will not sell holiday packages requiring Air Kärnten flights until the airline gains a license for their planned flight operations. The airline announced the likely start operations as a virtual airline as the licence might not be granted ahead of the start of operations.

Air Kärnten planned to lease a 50-seater Bombardier CRJ200 aircraft to operate their services. However, as of March 2015, a change of the desired aircraft type has been expressed. The airline additionally announced the lease of a Fokker 100 for some flights.

The first flights should have commenced by 30 April 2015, however the website of Air Kärnten has been shut down a few weeks prior to this date without further information and the flights have been removed from the schedule of Klagenfurt Airport, where Air Kärnten was supposed to be based. Therefore, the state of Air Kärnten remained unclear. As of February 2017, there were never any new signs of activity.

Destinations
As of April 2015, Air Kärnten planned to operate the following route network:

 Graz - Graz Airport seasonal
 Klagenfurt - Klagenfurt Airport  base

 Kos - Kos Island International Airport seasonal
 Preveza - Aktion National Airport seasonal
 Rhodes - Rhodes International Airport seasonal

 Naples - Naples International Airport seasonal

 Lisbon - Lisbon Portela Airport seasonal

 Girona - Girona–Costa Brava Airport seasonal
 Palma de Mallorca - Palma de Mallorca Airport seasonal

Fleet
As of April 2015, Air Kärnten planned to utilize the following aircraft:

References

External links
 Official website

Airlines established in 2014
Airlines disestablished in 2015
2015 disestablishments in Austria
Defunct airlines of Austria
Economy of Carinthia (state)
Klagenfurt
Austrian companies established in 2014